The Men's United States Squash Open 2013 is the men's edition of the 2013 United States Open (squash), which is a PSA World Series event Gold(Prize money: $115,000). The event took place at the Daskalakis Athletic Center in Philadelphia, Pennsylvania in the United States from the 13th of October to the 18th October. Grégory Gaultier won his second US Open trophy, beating Nick Matthew in the final.

Prize money and ranking points
For 2013, the prize purse was $115,000, which includes $100,000 of "on-site" prize money and $15,000 for hotel bonus. The on-site prize money and points breakdown is as follows:

Seeds

Draw and results

See also
United States Open (squash)
PSA World Series 2013
Women's United States Open (squash) 2013

References

External links
PSA US Open 2013 website
US Squash Open official website
US Squash Open 2012 Squashinfo website

Squash tournaments in the United States
Men's US Open
Men's US Open
Squash in Pennsylvania